The Jammu and Kashmir Academy of Art, Culture and Languages (also known as Cultural Academy) is a Society  registered with Government as a Cultural  organization dedicated to the promotion of regional languages, art and culture including theatre in Jammu and Kashmir, India.

The academy was set up by the Government of Jammu & Kashmir by proviso to Section 146 of the Constitution of Jammu and Kashmir, in the year 1958. It was declared an autonomous corporate body till 2019 when Jammu and Kashmir state was reorganised as UT of J&K and UT of Ladakh.

In 2021, the Govt of Jammu and Kashmir has converted Academy of Art, Culture, and Languages to a Society registered  under the Societies Registration Act, 1860. The decision was aimed to give maximum freedom to this institution to work as an independent institution,  after 2019.The reorganization of the academy is purely based on the existing models of central bodies like Sahitya Academy, Sangeet Natak Academy and Lalit Kala Academy.

As per new laws the JKAACL is now governed through a  various bodies: General Council, Central Committee, and Finance Committee.

The academy is working to promote publication of literature on art, culture and allied subjects including monographs, journals, dictionaries, and encyclopedias; sponsor and organize cultural exchanges, mushairas, symposiums, seminars, lectures, meets, camps, conferences, exhibitions, film shows, music, dance & drama performances, and cultural festivals; and encourage translations of literary works from one regional /national language into others and also from non-Indian into regional / national languages.

Jurisdiction
The jurisdiction of the academy covers the entire Jammu and Kashmir. It is the nodal agency in the matters of interaction and co-operation between the Jammu and Kashmir and the Central and other State Academies. It combines in itself the functions of:
 Language & Literature 
 Music, Dance ,Theatre  &  Performing Arts
 Visual,  creative and fine  Arts
The following languages are supported through this institution:

Centre for Language & Literature Jammu 
 HindiSection Language ,at Divisional Office (Jammu) of Academy at Jammu.
 Dogri Language Section,at Divisional Office (Jammu) of Academy at Jammu.
 Gojri Language  Section,at Divisional Office (Jammu) of Academy at Jammu.
 Punjabi Language  Section, at Divisional Office (Jammu) of Academy at Jammu.

Centre for Language & Literature Kashmir
 Urdu  Language Section , at  Divisional Office (Kashmir) of Academy at Srinagar.
 Kashmiri Language Section,  at  Divisional Office (Kashmir) of Academy at Srinagar.
 Pahari Language Section,at  Divisional Office (Kashmir) of Academy at Srinagar.
 EnglishSection,Language   at  Divisional Office (Kashmir) of Academy at Srinagar.
 Shina language

Notable personalities who are serving /served the Academy
Prominent writers and artists who served in JKAACL include: 
 Mohammad Yousuf Taing as Editor/ Former Secretary (Ex MLC), N D Sharma former Secretary, Balwant Thakur  former Secretary,   Ramesh Mehta, former Editor/ Secretary, Zaffar Iqbal Manhas former  Editor/ Secretary (EX.MLC), Javaid Rahi presently  serving  as Chief Editor, Aziz Hajini  former  Secretary, Ram Nath Shastri former Chief Editor, Moti Lal Saqi as Editor, Moti Lal Kemmu ,  former  Additional Secretary, Lalit Gupta former  Art Historian.

Location and management 
The academy has a main offices at Canal Road, Jammu  (opposite the science college) . The other offices are at Lalmandi Srinagar Rajouri, Kathua and Doda.

See also
Kashmiri cinema
Verite Film Festival (Kashmir)
Dogri cinema
Music of Jammu and Kashmir
Media in Jammu and Kashmir
Kus Bani Koshur Karorpaet

References

Academy Of Art, Culture And Languages
Academy Of Art, Culture And Languages
Educational institutions established in 1958
1958 establishments in Jammu and Kashmir
Cultural organisations based in India
State agencies of Jammu and Kashmir
Urdu Academies in India